Julia Elise Schacht (born 13 July 1982) is a Norwegian actress, born on the island of Helgøya in the lake Mjøsa.

Biography
Schacht was educated at Oslo National Academy of the Arts and Nordic Institute of Stage and Studio. She had her début in Pål Sletaune's 2005 thriller Next Door, which was only the second Norwegian movie ever to receive an over-18 rating. In 2005, Schacht was named "Norway's most sexy woman" by the men's magazine Mann. She also starred in Tommy Wirkola's horror comedy flick Kurt Josef Wagle and the Legend of the Fjord Witch.

Select filmography

References

External links

1982 births
Living people
People from Ringsaker
Norwegian film actresses
Oslo National Academy of the Arts alumni